Guryegu station is a KTX station in the city of Suncheon, South Jeolla Province, on the southern coast of South Korea. It is on the Jeolla Line.

External links
 Cyber station information from Korail

Railway stations in South Jeolla Province
Yeosu
Railway stations opened in 1930
Korea Train Express stations